Slovenian passports are issued to citizens of Slovenia to facilitate international travel. Every Slovenian citizen is also a citizen of the European Union. The passport, along with the national identity card allows for free rights of movement and residence in any of the states of the European Union, European Economic Area and Switzerland, as a result of the right of free movement and residence granted in Article 21 of the EU Treaty.

The Slovenian ID card is also valid for travel to other former Yugoslav republics: Croatia, Bosnia and Herzegovina, Macedonia, Montenegro, Serbia.

Physical appearance
Slovenian passports are the same burgundy colour as other European passports, with the Slovenian Coat of arms emblazoned in the centre of the front cover. Passports issued in officially bilingual areas of Slovenia also have Italian or Hungarian text below the Slovene. Slovenian passports have the standard biometric symbol at the bottom and use the standard EU design.

Visa requirements

 As of January 2023, Slovenian citizens had visa-free or visa on arrival access to 182 countries and territories, ranking the Slovenian passport 11th overall in terms of travel freedom (tied with the Hungarian, Latvian, Lithuanian, and Slovak passports), and the highest ranking of the former Yugoslavian states, according to the Henley Passport Index.

See also

 Passports of the European Union
 Visa requirements for Slovenian citizens

References

External links
 Brochure of Slovenian biometric passport (pdf file)

Foreign relations of Slovenia
Passports by country
European Union passports
Identity documents of Slovenia